KLAI (90.3 FM) is a radio station licensed to Laytonville, California, United States, the station serves the Fort Bragg-Ukiah area.  The station is currently owned by Redwood Community Radio Inc.

References

External links
 

LAI